Sir George Mainwaring (before 1551 – 1628) was an English politician.

He was the only son of Sir Arthur Mainwaring, MP for Ightfield, Shropshire, and was educated at Shrewsbury School (1562) and the Inner Temple (1565). He succeeded his father in 1590 and was knighted c. 1593.

He was elected to the Parliament of England as the MP for Shropshire in 1572. He was a Justice of the Peace for Shropshire by 1593, was appointed custos rotulorum of Shropshire c.1593-96, and a deputy lieutenant by 1608. He was also a member of the Council of the Marches of Wales by 1617.

He married Anne, the daughter of William More of Loseley Park, Surrey, and had 4 sons and a daughter, including:
 Sir Arthur Mainwaring
 Sir Henry Mainwaring
 Margaret Mainwaring (d. 1654), wife of Sir Richard Baker

References

 

16th-century births
1628 deaths
Politicians from Shropshire
People educated at Shrewsbury School
Members of the Inner Temple
English MPs 1572–1583
Deputy Lieutenants of Shropshire